Biagio Pace (Comiso, 13 November 1889 – Comiso, 28 September 1955) was an Italian archaeologist and fascist politician.

Biography

Political Activity
Teaching archaeology from 1917 at the University of Palermo, in 1922 Pace joined the National Fascist Party, and in 1924 was a candidate in Sicily on the Fascist slate and was elected to the Chamber of Deputies. He was consistently re-elected until 1939, and was President of the Legislative Commission for National Education. From 1939 until 1943, he was a national councillor in the Chamber of Fasces and Corporations.

On 26 December 1946 Pace presided over the founding meeting of the Italian Social Movement and in 1947 was elected to the National Executive Committee of the party.

Academic Activity
He was Professor of Archaeology and the History of Classical Art at the University of Pisa from 1925 and from 1932 to 1935 Head of the Faculty of Literature at the University of Naples Federico II. From 1926 he was Academic of the Lincei and then Academic of Italy. In the thirties he directed a mission in the Sahara which brought to light the civilization of the Garamantes. 
To him are owed the discoveries of Camarina and Mozia in Sicily and numerous studies on Byzantine Sicily.

In 1933 he was president of the High Council of Antiquities and Fine Arts. In 1943 he was assigned the "Mussolini Award" for the Moral & Historical Sciences by the Royal Academy of Italy.

Works 
Studi siciliani, Palermo, 1926
Dalla pianura di Adalia alla valle del Meandro, Milano, Alpes, 1927.
Arte e civiltà della Sicilia antica, Milano, Dante Alighieri, 1935
Tembien: Notte di un Legionario della "28 ottobre", Napoli, Ricciardi, 1936.
L'Impero e la collaborazione internazionale in Africa, Roma, National Institute of Fascist Culture, 1938.
Introduzione allo studio dell'archeologia, Milano, Mondadori, 1947

Bibliography
P. Giammellaro, Biagio Pace e la Sicilia antica, in "Studi Storici" 53 (2012), pp. 391–420

References

1889 births
1955 deaths
People from Comiso
Politicians from the Province of Ragusa
Italian fascists
Archaeologists from Sicily
Academic staff of the University of Pisa
20th-century archaeologists